Natalie C. J. Strynadka FRS is a professor of Biochemistry in the Department of Biochemistry and Molecular Biology at the University of British Columbia.

Education
Strynadka was educated at the University of Alberta where she was awarded a PhD in 1990. Her thesis committee included Michael N. G. James and Sir David Chilton Phillips.

Awards and honours
Strynadka was elected a Fellow of the Royal Society (FRS) in 2015. Her certificate of election reads:

References

Living people
Fellows of the Royal Society
Female Fellows of the Royal Society
1963 births